Sparv is a Swedish surname. Notable people with the surname include:

 Camilla Sparv (born 1943), Swedish actress
 Tim Sparv (born 1987), Finnish footballer

See also
Sparrow (surname)
Sperling
Vorobey

Swedish-language surnames
Surnames from nicknames